Thondavaram is a village in Ambajipeta Mandal in the East Godavari District of Andhra Pradesh, India.

Demographics

As of 2001 India census, Thondavaram  has a population of 3708 in 890 households.

References

Villages in East Godavari district